Bucci is an Italian surname. Notable people with the surname include:

Alberto Bucci (1948–2019), Italian professional basketball coach
Andrés Bucci, Chilean electronic music producer and DJ
Andrew Bucci (1922–2014), American artist
Annalisa Bucci (born 1983), Italian female kickboxer and mixed martial artist
Anselmo Bucci (1887–1955), Italian artist
Carolina Bucci (born 1976), Italian jewellery designer
Clemar Bucci (1920–2011), Argentine Formula One driver
Emiliano Bucci (born 1974), Italian pianist and composer
Eugênio Bucci, Brazilian journalist
Flavio Bucci (born 1947), Italian actor
George Bucci (born 1953), American professional basketball player
Ivano Bucci (born 1986), Sammarinese sprinter
Luca Bucci (born 1969), Italian professional football player
Marco Bucci (1960–2013), Italian discus thrower
Marco Bucci (politician) (born 1959), Italian politician and former pharmaceutical manager
Mark Bucci (1924–2002), American composer and playwright
Mary Bucci Bush (born 1949), American novelist
Maurizio Bucci (born 1923), Italian diplomat
Mike Bucci (born 1972), American professional wrestler
Nick Bucci (born 1990), Canadian former professional baseball pitcher
Nick Bucci (American football) (1932–2019), American football player
Paolo Bucci (born 1968), Italian gymnast
Pier Bucci, Chilean electronic music producer
Stefania Bucci (born 1960), Italian gymnast
Thomas W. Bucci, American attorney and the former mayor of Bridgeport, Connecticut

Italian-language surnames